Zhao Kezhi (born 28 December 1953) is a Chinese politician who served as a State Councilor of the People’s Republic of China and as the Minister and Party Committee Secretary of the Ministry of Public Security, with the top police officer rank of Police Commissioner General. He is the former Communist Party Secretary of Hebei and Guizhou provinces, and the former Governor of Guizhou province. He had also previously served as a vice governor of Shandong and Jiangsu provinces.

Career 
Zhao was born in Laixi, Shandong province. Zhao Kezhi entered the workforce in March 1973 as a middle school teacher in Laixi, and joined the Chinese Communist Party in January 1975.  In April 1984, he became the mayor and deputy Communist Party Chief of Laixi County, was transferred in March 1987 to be the mayor and deputy party chief of nearby Jimo, and became party chief of Jimo in 1989.  In December 1997, he was promoted to be the party chief of Dezhou, a prefecture-level city in Shandong.  From February 2001 to March 2006, he was a vice governor of Shandong province.

In 2006, Zhao Kezhi was transferred to neighbouring Jiangsu province, where he was the executive vice governor until August 2010, when he was transferred again to southwestern Guizhou province, where he was appointed deputy party chief and acting governor.  A month later he was elected by the Guizhou Provincial Congress as governor.  In July 2012 Zhao was promoted to concurrently serve as the Communist Party Secretary of Guizhou; in December he relinquished his governor post, and Chen Min'er was chosen as his successor.

In July 2015, following the dismissal of Zhou Benshun, Zhao was named party chief of Hebei province. During his term in Hebei, planning began for the ambitious Xiong'an New Area.  In October 2017, shortly after the 19th Party Congress, Zhao, then 63, was appointed as the Party Committee Secretary of the Ministry of Public Security. He was appointed as the Minister of Public Security on November 4, 2017.

In March 2018, Zhao was appointed as a State Councilor. In June 2018, he became 
Deputy Secretary of the Central Political and Legal Affairs Commission.

Zhao is a member of the 18th and 19th Central Committees of the Chinese Communist Party.

References 

Living people
1953 births
Chinese Communist Party politicians from Shandong
Delegates to the 17th National Congress of the Chinese Communist Party
Delegates to the 18th National Congress of the Chinese Communist Party
Delegates to the 19th National Congress of the Chinese Communist Party
Delegates to the 20th National Congress of the Chinese Communist Party
Delegates to the 11th National People's Congress
Delegates to the 12th National People's Congress
Delegates to the 13th National People's Congress
Governors of Guizhou
Members of the 18th Central Committee of the Chinese Communist Party
Members of the 19th Central Committee of the Chinese Communist Party
Ministers of Public Security of the People's Republic of China
People's Republic of China politicians from Shandong
Political office-holders in Jiangsu
Political office-holders in Shandong
Politicians from Qingdao
State councillors of China
Vice-governors of Shandong
Vice-governors of Jiangsu